Haematopinus is a genus of insects in the superfamily Anoplura, the sucking lice. It is the only genus in the family Haematopinidae, known commonly as the ungulate lice. All known species are of importance in veterinary medicine. These lice are some of the most economically important ectoparasites of domestic animals. Species infest many domesticated and wild large mammals, including cattle, horses, donkeys, swine, water buffalo, African buffalo, antelope, zebra, deer, and camels. The species Haematopinus tuberculatus has great importance in the water buffalo breading, since this louse is specific to buffaloes, being the main ectoparasite of the species, with important sanitary and economic burden. The Haematopinus tuberculatus is suspected to be involved in the transmission of diseases, such as anaplasmosis.  The parasites are found infesting buffaloes in greater concentrations around the ears, base of horns, side of the neck, around the scrotum or udder, and especially at the tip of the tail.

Species include:
Haematopinus acuticeps   
Haematopinus apri
Haematopinus asini – horse sucking louse  
Haematopinus breviculus   
Haematopinus bufali   
Haematopinus channabasavannai  
Haematopinus eurysternus – shortnosed cattle louse   
Haematopinus gorgonis   
Haematopinus jeannereti   
Haematopinus latus
Haematopinus longus 
Haematopinus ludwigi  
Haematopinus meinertzhageni
Haematopinus nigricantis   
Haematopinus oliveri – pygmy hog sucking louse
Haematopinus oryx  
Haematopinus phacochoeri    
Haematopinus quadripertusus – cattle tail louse    
Haematopinus suis – hog louse
Haematopinus taurotragi   
Haematopinus tuberculatus

References

Lice
Taxonomy articles created by Polbot